Ladywood is an inner-city district next to central Birmingham. Historically in Warwickshire, in June 2004, Birmingham City Council conducted a citywide "Ward Boundary Revision" to round-up the 39 Birmingham wards to 40. As a result of this, Ladywood Ward's boundaries were expanded to include the neighbouring areas of Hockley, Lee Bank and Birmingham city centre.

Demographics 
At the time of the 2001 Population Census, 23,789 people were living in the Ladywood Ward. The population density was 3,330 people per km2 living within its 7.1 km2 boundary, compared with 3,649 people per km2 for Birmingham. Nearly half of the population of Ladywood (49%) consisted of ethnic minorities compared with 29.6% for Birmingham in general. The largest ethnic minority groups were Afro-Caribbean at 13.18%, Indian at 11.65%, Pakistani at 10.64% and Mixed Race at 5.52%.

Housing and land use

The Ladywood ward combines areas of varying land-use, such that no generalisation is possible. There is the city centre (the economically valuable Central business district), the affluent Jewellery Quarter, and Broad Street areas which have become fashionable for "luxury flat" living, the Lee Bank area (now known as Park Central) which has been fully redeveloped, and there is the remainder of the ward, which is Ladywood itself (here referred to as "remainder Ladywood" – i.e., what is Ladywood itself) which is relatively economically impoverished.

Most of "remainder Ladywood" was redeveloped during the 1960s, with decaying terraced slums being cleared to make way for new low-rise housing and high-rise flats. Although the newer homes were an improvement on their predecessors in terms of quality and sanitation, social problems became prevalent in much of the local area including car crime, drug dealing, anti-social behaviour and many of the other problems commonly associated with inner city areas across England.

More than 20 multi-storey blocks of council flats were built around Ladywood during the 1960s and 1970s; however, six of them were demolished in the early 2000s.

More recently there has been investment in physical improvements to the area. Some tower blocks have been either demolished or improved, not least with introduction of concierge or CCTV security systems. These and other such measures may have resulted in a reduction of antisocial behaviour.

There are plans to build high-density housing, possibly over 1,100 units, on 54 acres of derelict industrial land at Icknield Port. The proposals include old-style back-to-backs with internal courtyards raising fears of future slums.

The area is served by two libraries; Spring Hill Library and Ladywood Library.

Politics 
The ward is currently represented by two Labour councillors at the Birmingham City Council: Sir Albert Bore and Kath Hartley.

Ladywood Ward has adopted a "Committee Manager" and an "Interim Neighbourhood Manager". These are Kay Thomas and Sandra Lawrence respectively.

Notable residents 
 Washington Irving (1783–1859) American writer. Inspired to write while living with family in Birmingham.
 Alfred Joseph Knight (1888–1960). World War I Victoria Cross recipient.
J.R.R. Tolkien (1892–1973) author and academic lived in an area of Edgbaston now taken over by the extension of the Ladywood Ward boundaries.

See also
St John's Church, Ladywood

References

External links 
 Birmingham City Council: Ladywood Constituency
Birmingham City Council: Ladywood Ward
Ladywood Community Network pages
Digital Ladywood – On-line local history project
Park Central Development – Ladywood 

 
Areas of Birmingham, West Midlands
Wards of Birmingham, West Midlands